Lycia is a genus of moths in the family Geometridae.

Species
 Lycia alpina (Sulzer, 1776)
 Lycia degtjarevae Viidalepp, 1986
 Lycia florentina (Stefanelli, 1882)
 Lycia graecarius (Staudinger, 1861)
 Lycia hanoviensis Heymons, 1891
 Lycia hirtaria (Clerck, 1759)
 Lycia incisaria (Lederer, 1870)
 Lycia isabellae (Harrison, 1914)
 Lycia lapponaria (Boisduval, 1840)
 Lycia liquidaria (Eversmann, 1848)
 Lycia necessaria (Zeller, 1849)
 Lycia pomonaria (Hübner, 1792)
 Lycia rachelae (Hulst, 1896)
 Lycia ursaria (Walker, 1860)
 Lycia ypsilon (Forbes, 1885)
 Lycia zonaria (Denis & Schiffermüller, 1775)

Hybrids
 Lycia hirtaria × pomonaria
 Lycia isabellae × pomonaria

References
Natural History Museum Lepidoptera genus database
Lycia at funet

External links 
 European Butterflies and Moths by Christopher Jonko

Bistonini